Colección Cristiana is the 12th album by Dominican songwriter and musician Juan Luis Guerra, released on February 28, 2012. It is also his first Christian album since 2004's Para Ti.

Unlike the first Christian album, Para Ti in 2004, this album is distinguished for being very varied in terms of the musical genres it offers, since it contains merengue, bachata, son, pop, ballad and merengue tipico o perico ripiao. Also, the disc is characterized to include four subjects that were sent in productions previously: "Las Avispas", "Para Ti" and "Soldado", which belong to the album Para Ti and "Son al Rey" of the previous album A Son De Guerra .

Reception 
Mariano Prunes of Allmusic gave the album a positive review and wrote "this collection is a standard Juan Luis Guerra and 440 release, a celebration of life set to the best and most joyful merengue and bachata music the world has to offer".

The album debuted at number 6 on the Billboard Top Latin Albums and number 2 on the Billboard Tropical Albums. The lead single "En el Cielo No Hay Hospital" had a moderate success in the charts as well. The album also peaked at number 41 on the Spanish Albums Chart.

Track listing

Charts

Weekly charts

Year-end charts

References 

2012 compilation albums
Christian music albums by Dominican Republic artists
Juan Luis Guerra compilation albums
Christian music compilation albums